Cerej is a settlement next to Hrvatini in the City Municipality of Koper in the Littoral region of Slovenia, right on the border with Italy.

References

External links
Cerej on Geopedia

Populated places in the City Municipality of Koper